Wüstenrot is a town in Germany.

Wüstenrot may also refer to:
 Wüstenrot & Württembergische, a German financial company
 Wüstenrot-Gruppe, an Austrian financial company
 SV Wüstenrot Salzburg, the 1997–2005 name of FC Red Bull Salzburg, an Austrian association football club, based in Wals-Siezenheim
 Wüstenrot Tower (German: Wüstenrot-Hochhaus), the central office building of GdF Wüstenrot, a well-known German building and loan association, in Ludwigsburg